Antons Kurakins (born 1 January 1990) is a Latvian professional football defender who last played as a left-back for Riga FC and the Latvia national football team.

Career
After starting his career in his home country with Multibanka Rīga, RSK Dižvanagi Rēzekne and FK Blāzma Rēzekne Kurakins then moved to Scotland, signing  for Celtic, where he played in the club's youth side. During his time at Celtic, he went out on loan to Brechin City in April 2010 and to Stranraer in February 2011.

After a spell with FK Ventspils, Kurakins returned to Scotland in July 2015, signing for Hamilton Academical. He was released by the club on 24 August 2016. He then returned to Latvia, where he spent several months training with Riga FC, and joined the club in 2017. Kurakins stayed with the club for five seasons, departing at the end of the 2022 season.

International career

Kurakins made his first international appearance in a friendly against Macedonia on 5 March 2014, playing the entire match.

Honours
Club
Ventspils
 Virslīga (2): 2013, 2014
 Latvian Cup (1):  2012–13

National Team
 Baltic Cup (2): 2014, 2016

References

External links
 

1990 births
Living people
Latvian footballers
Latvian expatriate footballers
Latvia international footballers
Association football fullbacks
RSK Dižvanagi players
Celtic F.C. players
Brechin City F.C. players
Stranraer F.C. players
FK Ventspils players
Hamilton Academical F.C. players
Riga FC players
Scottish Football League players
Scottish Professional Football League players
Latvian Higher League players
Expatriate footballers in Scotland
Latvian expatriate sportspeople in Scotland
Latvian people of Russian descent